Yang Seung-ho (born October 16, 1987), also known as Seungho, is a South Korean idol singer, dancer, actor, and the leader of South Korean boy band MBLAQ, currently active in South Korea under Will Entertainment.

Career

Pre-debut
When Yang was young, he won a couple of singing contests that he joined. In addition, he had a television appearance in Sharp 1 as a cameo in between 2003 and 2005. He was also featured in its soundtrack entitled "Gray Sky" by Lee Hyun-jung.

MBLAQ 

After training under Rain and J. Tune Entertainment, Yang became a member of South Korean quintet boy band MBLAQ, serving as their leader, lead dancer and vocalist. The group made their unofficial debut on October 9, 2009 and officially debut on October 15, 2009 during Rain's Legend of Rainism concert, where they performed various songs from their then-unreleased single album Just BLAQ. Their performance that day was met with praise, with many concert spectators and fans considering them to be the next TVXQ.

MBLAQ's first single, "Oh Yeah", was released to the public through a music video on October 14, 2009 together with their debut single album, Just BLAQ. Afterwards, they had their broadcast debut on Mnet's M! Countdown, performing their single. The group also made their Japanese debut on May 3, 2011. They held an event at the Kanagawa Lazona Kawasaki Plaza, which gathered a reported 10,000 fans. A day later, on May 4, they released their first Japanese album Your Luv. The album immediately reached first position at the Oricon Daily Charts, selling more than 11,000 copies.

The group has starred in various South Korean variety shows as guests. They also had their own variety shows such as Mnet's MBLAQ – The Art of Seduction, MBC's MBLAQ's Idol Army, Mnet's Sesame Player and KBS's Hello Baby Season 5.

Since their debut, MBLAQ has released three single albums, six extended play albums, one studio album, one repackaged studio album, and two EPs in Korean. They also released one compilation album, four singles and four DVDs in Japanese.

Actor
On April 25, 2017, Yang signed a contract with Will Entertainment to start afresh as an actor. At Will Entertainment, Yang will not only act, but also release music and actively promote himself in various ways.

Other activities
Besides the group activities, Yang also guests on various television shows as a solo artist as well. These include Super Junior Miracle, Idol Maknae Rebellion, Kara Bakery, and Running Man, among others.

Personal life
Yang Seung-ho was born on October 16, 1987 in Seoul. His family consists of a mother, a father, and a younger brother. When he was young, his family moved to Anyang, Gyeonggi and was raised there. He attended Anyang High School of Arts. After high school, he enrolled at the Sejong University of Film Arts but left afterwards due to MBLAQ's busy schedule. He now attends Kyung Hee Cyber University.

Yang is the only member in the group who uses his real name; his stage name was originally intended to be "Mir" but he rejected it.

Discography

Collaborations

Writing credits 
All song credits are adapted from the Korea Music Copyright Association's database.

Original sound tracks (OSTs)

Filmography

Televisions

Film

Dramas

Musical theatre

References

1987 births
J. Tune Entertainment artists
Living people
K-pop singers
South Korean male idols
South Korean dance musicians
South Korean rhythm and blues singers
South Korean pop singers
South Korean male singers
South Korean male film actors
South Korean male television actors
Kyung Hee Cyber University alumni
People from Seoul
Male actors from Seoul
Singers from Seoul
MBLAQ members
Anyang Arts High School alumni